The 2011 Formula Renault 2.0 Alps Series was the first year of the Formula Renault 2.0 Alps series, and the tenth season of the former Swiss Formula Renault Championship. The championship began on 26 March at Monza and finished on 2 October at Spa after fourteen races held at seven meetings.

Drivers and teams

Race calendar and results

Championship standings

Drivers' Championship

Junior's Championship

Teams' Championship

References

External links
 Official website of the Formula Renault 2.0 Alps championship

Alps
Formula Renault 2.0 Alps
Renault Alps